Amherst is a census-designated place (CDP) and a post office in and governed by Phillips County, Colorado, United States. The Amherst post office has the ZIP Code 80721. At the United States Census 2010, the population of the Amherst CDP was 47 in 2020, while the population of the 80721 ZIP Code Tabulation Area was 154 including adjacent areas.

History
The town of Amherst was established about 1887. The community was named after Amherst, Massachusetts, the native home of a local businessman. The Amherst Post Office opened on February 18, 1888.Phillips county was founded in 1889, before that Amherst was in Weld County.--

(More Information for Amherst Colorado is at The Phillips County Museum at  109 S Campbell Ave, Holyoke, CO 80734 )

Geography

Demographics

See also

 List of census-designated places in Colorado

References

External links

Census-designated places in Phillips County, Colorado
Census-designated places in Colorado